Juan de Zavala y de la Puente, 1st Marquess of Sierra Bullones (27 December 1804, in Lima, Viceroyalty of Peru – 29 December 1879, in Madrid, Spain) was a Spanish noble and politician. After fighting in the First Carlist War, the Marquess served as Prime Minister of Spain.

He was the son of Pedro José de Zavala y Bravo de Rivero, 7th Marquess of San Lorenzo, and Grimanesa de la Puente y Bravo de Lagunas, marchioness de la Puente.

Marriage and issue

He married on 1839 María del Pilar de Guzmán, 24ht Duchess of Nájera, and had five children:
Juan de Zavala, 25th Duke of Nájera, husband of Caroliba Santamarca, 2nd Countess of Santamarca.
Luis de Zavala, 26th Duke of Nájera, married to Guillermina Heredia y Barrón.
María del Pilar de Zavala, 20th Marchioness of Aguilar de Campoo, married to Ventura García-Sancho, 1st Count of Consuegra.
Juana de Zavala, 7th Countess of Villaseñor, married to Camilo Hurtado de Amézaga, 6th Marquess of the Riscal.
María Grimanesa de Zavala, 7th Marchioness of San Lorenzo del Valleumbroso, married to Juan Larios y Enríquez.

|-

Spanish captain generals
101
Marquesses of Spain
Counts of Spain
Grandees of Spain
Prime Ministers of Spain
Foreign ministers of Spain
1804 births
1879 deaths
Progressive Party (Spain) politicians
Government ministers during the First Spanish Republic
Knights of the Golden Fleece
Grand Crosses of the Order of Saint-Charles